Mei Foo Sun Chuen or simply Mei Foo is a large private housing estate in Lai Chi Kok, Kowloon, Hong Kong. Mei Foo Sun Chuen was the first large scale private housing estate in Hong Kong and at the time of completion, the 99-tower complex was considered the largest private housing development in the world, accommodating some 70,000 – 80,000 people in 13,500 apartments. It is considered to be one of the world's largest privately financed residential condominium projects.

History
The 40-acre Mei Foo Sun Chuen, with a total of ninety-nine blocks, was completed from 1968 to 1978 in eight separate but interconnected stages. The redevelopment was carried out by Mei Foo Investments Limited, a subsidiary company of Mobil Oil (Hong Kong) Limited. The name, Mobil, was translated into 無比 ( mou 4 bei2) before the Sun Chuen (Estate) completed.

Mei Foo Sun Chuen was conceived to meet the housing needs of Hong Kong's middle-income families, an emerging and growing group at the time. At the time, a flat in Mei Foo cost around HK$40,000.

When built, the estate was adjacent to the sea and to Lai Chi Kok Bay, with a waterfront walkway and flats with waterfront balconies. However, this changed due to the West Kowloon reclamation scheme (starting in 1990) and the estate now borders Lai Chi Kok Park.

Buildings
The residential complexes of Mei Foo were considered very affluent for the standards at the time they were built; every flat offers a balcony, at least two rooms and one bathroom. Every apartment complex has a 24-hour uniformed, unarmed security force. Entry to a residential block requires an entrance code, which changes periodically.

Mei Foo Sun Chuen has several schools, medical clinics, beauty salons, newspaper kiosks, supermarkets, shopping arcades, restaurants and food markets within its vicinity, making the area very convenient for residents. The private secondary schools in particular were notable for academically poor students. However, some schools have evolved into multicultural ones.

The once largest owners' corporation with legal status in Hong Kong, the Incorporated Owners of Mei Foo Sun Chuen – Stage I, was formed in 1997. The founder of the corporation, Yiu Chi-Wai, served as the Chairman of the Management Committee from 1997 to 2000. The other seven stages' owners' corporations were also formed during the period.

Demographics
In the 2016 by-census, the population of Mei Foo Sun Chuen was recorded as 37,303. The median age of the estate's residents was 42.7.

Transport
Mei Foo is on the crossroad between Kowloon and Tsuen Wan. It is also considered part of the west border of urban Kowloon. Kwai Chung Road and Lai Chi Kok Bridge are the major roads in the area. A major bus terminus is located under the Kwai Chung Road underpass. serving as a terminus for multiple bus routes. The MTR rapid transit railway services Mei Foo station is connected to the Tsuen Wan line, completed in 1982, and to the Tuen Ma Line, operational since 2003. Alternate forms of public transport like minibuses and taxis also service the estate.

In 2009, the new Route 8 tunnels opened near Mei Foo, providing a much more direct road link to the eastern New Territories.

Events
 DBS Bank safe deposit box destruction incident (2October 2004)

Gallery
A collection of photos pertaining to Mei Foo Sun Chuen is shown below:

See also
 Mei Foo station
 List of buildings and structures in Hong Kong
 List of places in Hong Kong
 Wong Tung & Partners
 Mei Foo Ferry Pier

References

External links

 S.K. Hui, A. Cheung, J. Pang, "A Hierarchical Bayesian Approach for Residential Property Valuation:Application to Hong Kong Housing Market", International Real Estate Review, 2010 Vol. 13 No.1: pp. 1 – 29
 Yu, Pui-kwan, Robin, "A study on quasi-public space in large scale private residential development, case in Hong Kong", University of Hong Kong, 2007

Private housing estates in Hong Kong
Lai Chi Kok
1968 establishments in Hong Kong
ExxonMobil history
Housing estates with centralized LPG system in Hong Kong